Vilarinho is a parish in the municipality of Santo Tirso in Portugal. The population in 2011 was 3,788, in an area of 5.27 km2. It is an important industry center located 15 km north east of the city of Santo Tirso near other important textile centers like Vizela and Guimarães.

References

Freguesias of Santo Tirso